Guntupalli Venkata Lakshmi Narasimha Rao is an Indian politician of the Bharatiya Janata Party. He is a member of the Rajya Sabha, the upper house of Indian Parliament, representing the state of Uttar Pradesh.

Rao frequently appears on national television networks representing the BJP led by National President J.P. Nadda on important topics. Rao is a senior leader of the BJP in Andhra Pradesh and a member of the party’s Core Committee in the state deciding party's political and policy position on various issues.

Rao is a Member of various important parliamentary committees; the Standing Committee on Finance, the Committee of Privileges, Consultative Committee of External Affairs and is a Member of the Spices Board, Tobacco Board and Chairman of the Chilli Task Force Committee of the Spices Board, Ministry of Commerce, Government of India.

Early life 
GVL Narasimha Rao's ancestral village is Ballikurava in newly created Bapatla District of Andhra Pradesh where his father served as Panchayat Sarpanch for three decades. GVL belongs to Narasaraopet, headquarter town of newly created Palnadu district where he studied up to Intermediate and later did his Agricultural BSc degree in Bapatla Agricultural College and his MBA (PGDRM) from Institute of Rural Management (IRMA), Anand (Gujarat).

Political career
Rao served as National Spokesperson of the central committee of BJP, chaired by former National President Amit Shah and frequently appears on national television networks representing the BJP led by National President J.P. Nadda on important topics. Rao is a senior leader of the BJP in Andhra Pradesh and a member of the party’s Core Committee in Andhra Pradesh deciding party's political and policy position on various issues. 

Rao is a Member of various important parliamentary committees; the Standing Committee on Finance, the Committee of Privileges, Consultative Committee of External Affairs and is a Member of the Spices Board, Tobacco Board and Chairman of the Chilli Task Force Committee of the Spices Board, Ministry of Commerce, Government of India.

He hails from Narasaraopet  in Palnadu District of Andhra Pradesh. He was elected to the Rajya Sabha from Uttar Pradesh in March 2018.

References

Living people
Rajya Sabha members from Uttar Pradesh
Bharatiya Janata Party politicians from Andhra Pradesh
Andhra Pradesh politicians
1964 births